The 2015 New Brunswick Scotties Tournament of Hearts, the provincial women's curling championship of New Brunswick were held January 29 to February 1 at the Tri County Complex Arena in Fredericton Junction, New Brunswick.  The winning Sylvie Robichaud team represented New Brunswick at the 2015 Scotties Tournament of Hearts in Moose Jaw and finished the round robin with a 4-7 record.

Teams
The teams are listed as follows:

Round-robin standings

Scores

January 29
Draw 1
Robichaud 7-3 Levesque
Mallais 10-7 McCann
Adams 7-5 Tatlock

Draw 2
Tatlock 10-3 McCann
Robichaud 6-5 Adams
Malls 9-6 Levesque

January 30
Draw 3
Mallais 6-5 Tatlock
Robichaud 10-7 McCann
Adams 8-7 Levesque

Draw 4
Adams 11-5 McCann
Tatlcok 7-4 Levesque
Robichaud 6-5 Mallais

January 31
Draw 5
McCann 8-5 Levesque
Tatlock 6-5 Robichaud
Adams 7-1 Mallais

Tie breaker
Tatlock 7-6 Mallais

Playoffs

Final

References

New Brunswick Scotties Tournament of Hearts
Curling competitions in New Brunswick
Sunbury County, New Brunswick
New Brunswick Scotties Tournament of Hearts